The Introduction of the 2. Bundesliga was the step of establishing a professional second tier association football league in Germany in 1974. The new league, the 2. Bundesliga, played its first season in 1974–75 and continues to be the second-highest league in the country. Its introduction reduced the number of second divisions in Germany from five to two and the number of teams at this level from 83 to 40. It eliminated the necessity of having a promotion round at the end of the season to determine the two teams promoted to the Bundesliga.

History

Germany's second tier of football, the Regionalliga, had been established in 1963 with the introduction of the Bundesliga. The Regionalliga was played in five regional divisions, North, West, South, South-West and Berlin. This arrangement however meant that, to determine the two teams that would be promoted to the Bundesliga at the end of each season, a promotion play-off had to be held after the end of the regular league season. These play-offs were originally made up of the five Regionalliga champions and runners-up, except for Berlin, where only the champions qualified from. Later, the Berlin runners-up was admitted, too. Clubs relegated from the Bundesliga experienced a drop from a nationwide professional league to semi-professional and financially unattractive regional leagues.

The decision to establish a 2. Bundesliga with two regional divisions made up of 20 teams each, North and South, was made at the annual convention of the German Football Association, the DFB, at Frankfurt on 30 June 1973. For the new northern division, eleven clubs from the west, seven clubs from the north and two clubs from Berlin were meant to qualify however, only one club from Berlin took up the option, leaving another spot for the west. For the new southern division, seven clubs from the south-west and 13 clubs from the south qualified. The two teams relegated from the Bundesliga, Hannover 96 and SC Fortuna Köln, were deducted from the quota of the region they belonged to.

The qualifying process for the 2. Bundesliga

Qualifying system
The qualifying system took into account the last five seasons of the Regionalliga, whereby points were awarded for final placings. The last placed team in each season received one point, the second last two and so on up to the league champions which received points equal to the number of teams in the league. The points for the last season, 1973–74, where multiplied by three, the points for the previous two doubled and the points for the first two counted just single. Clubs that played in the Bundesliga in any of those five seasons received 25 points per season, which were also multiplied according to the before mentioned modus, depending which season they played in the Bundesliga. Clubs that played below the Regionalliga in any of the five season received no points for those seasons. Only clubs that played in the Regionalliga or Bundesliga in the 1973–74 season could qualify for the new league. Regionalliga clubs that finished on a relegation rank in 1973–74 were also barred from qualifying. If two clubs where on equal points overall the final placing of 1973–74 was taken to determine who ranked higher.

2. Bundesliga Nord

Twenty teams from three different leagues qualified for the northern division.

From the Regionalliga Nord
Eintracht Braunschweig, the last champions of the Regionalliga Nord and the team with the most points in the five-year ranking for the league won promotion to the Bundesliga in 1974. In turn, Hannover 96, a northern club, was relegated form the Bundesliga to the new 2. Bundesliga. The next two qualified clubs, FC St. Pauli and VfL Osnabrück had been strong performers in the league over the years, with both winning seven league championships between them. Of the remaining qualified sides, VfL Wolfsburg had been a top side in the league in its eleven years of existence, too. HSV Barmbeck-Uhlenhorst had been on the rise only since 1970 while 1. SC Göttingen 05 had slowly been declining in results since 1968. Finally, Olympia Wilhelmshaven qualified as somewhat of an outsider. Of the established teams that failed to qualify Holstein Kiel and Arminia Hannover had both played in the league in every season and also won league championships. TuS 93 Bremerhaven and VfB Lübeck had also played in the league in every season but generally been less successful.

The points table:

From the Regionalliga West
Eleven clubs qualified from the Regionalliga West for the new 2. Bundesliga, with a twelfth club, Fortuna Köln, entering the new league after being relegated from the Bundesliga. Of the teams qualified for the league only Schwarz-Weiß Essen had played every season in the Regionalliga while SG Wattenscheid 09, Rot-Weiß Oberhausen and Alemannia Aachen had previously won the league. Bayer Uerdingen, with three seasons, and 1. FC Mülheim-Styrum, with two, had been relatively new to the Regionalliga, while Preußen Münster, Borussia Dortmund and Arminia Bielefeld had been former Bundesliga sides. DJK Gütersloh and SpVgg Erkenschwick had only competed in the league during the five year qualifying period but consistent results in this time meant the two clubs qualified, too. Of the clubs that missed out Viktoria Köln and Westfalia Herne had been stronger clubs in the Oberliga area, failed to make an impression in the Regionalliga but would, in the coming years, still earn promotion to the 2. Bundesiga.

The points table:

From the Regionalliga Berlin
Of the Regionalliga Berlin clubs, only Wacker 04 took up the option of entering the new 2. Bundesliga. Tennis Borussia qualified for the Bundesliga, and Blau-Weiß 1890 Berlin, next in line for the 2. Bundesliga qualification declined, as did every other club in the league.

The points table:

2. Bundesliga Süd

Twenty teams from two different leagues qualified for the southern division.

From the Regionalliga Süd
Of the thirteen clubs from the Regionalliga Süd that qualified for the new 2. Bundesliga, the top two, TSV 1860 München and 1. FC Nürnberg had won German championships during the Regionalliga area. A third one, Karlsruher SC, had been a founding member of the Bundesliga. The last champions of the league, FC Augsburg, finished fourteenth in the five-year ranking, nominally just outside the thirteen qualified teams. However, the three last placed teams in the league in 1973–74, despite two of them having more points than FCA, could not qualify. One of those three, KSV Hessen Kassel, had been a strong team over the years, playing every season, and even won the inaugural championship of the league, but only managed to come 16th in the final year. Of the other nine qualified teams, Stuttgarter Kickers, FC Bayern Hof, SpVgg Fürth and FC Schweinfurt 05 had also played all eleven seasons of the league. SV Darmstadt 98, SV Waldhof Mannheim and SpVgg Bayreuth qualified on the strength of two excellent last seasons in the league while VfR Heilbronn achieved consistent results over the qualifying period. VfR Mannheim finally was the team with lowest points total to qualify from any Regionalliga and also made Mannheim the only other city alongside Hamburg to have two 2. Bundesliga teams for the inaugural season. Of the non-qualified teams Freiburger FC had also played every season of the Regionalliga.

The points table:

From the Regionalliga Südwest
The Regionalliga Südwest saw some controversy in selecting their seven clubs qualified for the 2. Bundesliga when SV Alsenborn was omitted for failing to fulfill all license regulations and eight placed 1. FC Saarbrücken admitted instead. SV Alsenborn, with three league championships to its name, was the only club to miss out under such circumstances while 1. FC Saarbrücken was the home club of soon to become DFB-chairman Hermann Neuberger. The other six clubs were all more obvious choices, Borussia Neunkirchen a former Bundesliga club, SV Röchling Völklingen, FSV Mainz 05, VfR Wormatia Worms and FK Pirmasens all having played every season in the league and, at various occasions either finished champions or runners-up. The seventh club, FC 08 Homburg, had entered the league in 1966 and gradually improved without ever finishing in the top two. Of the clubs that failed to qualify Südwest Ludwigshafen and TuS Neuendorf had also played every season in the league while, of the other six non-qualifiers, only ASV Landau had performed well during the five year qualifying period. FC Ensdorf, with three to its name, held the lowest point total of any Regionalliga club of 1973–74.

The points table:

Key

 ‡ Denotes club had finished the 1973–74 season on a relegation rank and was barred from qualifying for the Regionalliga.

Changes to the league system
Unlike in 1963 when the Bundesliga was introduced and the league system below it experienced major changes, too, the introduction of the 2. Bundesliga did not have such a great impact. The biggest change was made in the area of the Regionalliga Nord where the third tier saw the introduction of the Oberliga Nord. This league covered the same area as the Regionalliga Nord and replaced the Amateurliga Bremen, Landesliga Hamburg, Amateurliga Niedersachsen and Landesliga Schleswig-Holstein at this level. In all other regions the third division remained untouched until a major reorganisation was carried out in 1978.

The league system 1973–74
The top three divisions of the league system in the season before the introduction of the 2. Bundesliga:

The league system 1974–75
The top three divisions of the league system in the season after the introduction of the 2. Bundesliga:

Aftermath
The new second division in German football was, in this form, only to last for seven seasons. In 1981 another change was made when the 2. Bundesliga was reduced to one single division of 20 clubs. In this format it stayed until 1992, when the German reunion and the influx of clubs from former East Germany led to an expansion of the league to 24 teams for two seasons. The first of those was played in a northern and southern division, after this it returned to single division format. From 1994 onwards the league played with only 18 clubs, a number it continues to have today.

In regards to promotion from 1974 onwards three spots were available for the 2. Bundesliga. The champions were promoted directly while the runners-up played each other in a two-leg play-off to determine another spot. Promotion to the 2. Bundesliga was determined through direct promotion as well as promotion rounds, with the champions of the larger Amateurligas and Oberligas being promoted directly while the smaller ones had to decide the remaining spots in play-offs. This changed in 1978 when the third divisions were reformed and reduced in numbers.

The first-ever game in the 2. Bundesliga was played between 1. FC Saarbrücken and Darmstadt 98, with Nikolaus Semlitsch scoring the first-ever goal of the new league. Of the 40 founding members of the 2. Bundesliga, SC Fortuna Köln became the longest-lasting club, playing 26 consecutive seasons in the league until 2000, when the club was relegated, ten seasons longer than second-longest Alemannia Aachen, who held out until 1990.

References

Sources
 30 Jahre Bundesliga  30th anniversary special, publisher: kicker Sportmagazin, published: 1993
 kicker-Almanach 1990  Yearbook of German football, publisher: kicker Sportmagazin, published: 1989, 
 DSFS Liga-Chronik seit 1945  publisher: DSFS, published: 2005

External links
  
 DFB — Deutscher Fußball Bund (German Football Association)

2. Bundesliga
1974 establishments in West Germany
1973–74 in German football leagues
1974–75 in German football leagues